The Gnome-Rhône 14K Mistral Major was a 14-cylinder, two-row, air-cooled radial engine. It was Gnome-Rhône's major aircraft engine prior to World War II, and matured into a highly sought-after design that would see licensed production throughout Europe and Japan. Thousands of Mistral Major engines were produced, used on a wide variety of aircraft.

Design and development

In 1921 Gnome-Rhône purchased a license for the highly successful Bristol Jupiter engine and produced it until about 1930, alongside the smaller Bristol Titan. Starting in 1926, however, they used the basic design of the Titan to produce a family of new engines, the so-called "K series". These started with the 5K Titan, followed by the 7K Titan Major and 9K Mistral. By 1930, 6,000 of these engines had been delivered.

However, the aircraft industry at that time was rapidly evolving and producing much larger aircraft that demanded larger engines to power them. Gnome-Rhône responded by developing the 7K into a two-row version that became the 14K Mistral Major. The first test examples were running in 1929.

As the Jupiter had set the pattern for one-row radials in the 1920s, the Mistral Major became a canonical design for twin-row radials of the 1930s. It was widely licensed and formed the basis for many successful designs. Among the licensees were Industria Aeronautică Română in Romania, Manfred Weiss in Hungary, Alvis of the UK, Tumansky in the USSR, Walter of Czechoslovakia, and Isotta Fraschini and Piaggio in Italy. Nakajima in Japan also licensed it, but did not put it into production, developing their own designs based on features taken from the Mistral and other designs.

Variants
14Kbr Reduction gearing
14Kbrs Supercharged with reduction gearing
14Kdr Reduction gearing
14Kds Supercharger
14Kdrs Supercharged with reduction gearing
14Kes Supercharged (LH rotation)
14Kfs Supercharged (RH rotation Kers)
14Kirs Supercharged with reduction gearing (LH rotation)
14Kjrs Supercharged with reduction gearing (RH rotation Kirs)
14Knrs Supercharged with reduction gearing (LH rotation)

14Kors Supercharged with reduction gearing (RH rotation Knrs)
Alvis Pelides
Development of engine with British fasteners. 15 built before project abandoned with start of Second World War as no suitable use in Air Ministry plans.
Isotta Fraschini K.14 license-built in Italy by Isotta Fraschini
IAM K14 licensed derivative produced in Yugoslavia
IAR K14 licensed derivative produced in Romania
Manfréd Weiss WM K-14licensed derivative produced in Hungary
Piaggio P.XI licensed derivative produced in Italy
Piaggio P.XIX higher compression development of Piaggio P.XI
Tumansky M-85 license-built in USSR by Tumansky
Tumansky M-86 960 hp (715 kW) development of M-85 through increased supercharging and a higher compression ratio.
Tumansky M-87 
Tumansky M-88
Walter Mistral Major
ИАМ K.14

Applications

Aircraft powered by G-R 14K derivatives

Specifications (Gnome-Rhône 14Kd)

Gallery

See also

References

 Danel, Raymond and Cuny, Jean. L'aviation française de bombardement et de renseignement 1918-1940 Docavia n°12, Editions Larivière

1920s aircraft piston engines
Aircraft air-cooled radial piston engines
Mistral Major
K.14
M-85